Playing the race card is an idiomatic phrase that refers to the exploitation by someone of either racist or anti-racist attitudes in the audience in order to gain an advantage. It constitutes an accusation of bad faith directed at the person or persons raising concerns as regards racism.

Usage
The phrase is generally used by people to allege that someone has deliberately and falsely accused another person or group of people of being a racist in order to gain some sort of advantage.  An example of this use of the term occurred during the O. J. Simpson murder trial, when critics accused the defense of "playing the race card" in presenting Mark Fuhrman's use of the N word, an ethnic slur, and opinions on black people via the Fuhrman tapes as reasons to draw his credibility as a witness into question.

Stanford professor Richard Thompson Ford has argued that the race card can be played independently of the person making the claim, or the race in question. An example cited was the Hillary Clinton campaign's assertion that Obama won the 2008 Democratic primary in South Carolina owing to the disproportionate number of black registered Democrats in the state, implying more racism in the general population.

George Dei, et al., in the book Playing the Race Card argue that the term itself is a rhetorical device used in an effort to devalue and minimize claims of racism.

Other uses
The phrase has been used to describe racist mobilisations by politicians, as for example with the campaign to elect Peter Griffiths, the Conservative Party candidate for Smethwick in the 1964 UK general election. However, the term was only applied to describe this situation in the 1980s.

Malaysian politics
In February 2008, Group Chief Editor Wong Chun Wai of The Star wrote, just before the Malaysia general election came, there is an unusual degree of tolerance and flexibility in matters of race, language and religion as politicians try to woo the people. "Also, there are those who still continue to play the race card, in this age and time. At their party conferences each year, they play to the gallery by projecting themselves as the communal heroes. But during the general election, they shamelessly become the true Malaysian leaders we dream of. They greet their voters in Malay, English, Mandarin and Tamil; and if they can speak all these languages fluently, they would do so."

In August 2006, the Singapore Institute of International Affairs wrote that Malaysia politician Khairy Jamaluddin "played the race card" by stirring up the Malays and the Chinese Malaysian community. Responding to criticisms and demands for an apology, Khairy said his remarks were misunderstood and he "will not apologize" as he was acting only "in defense of the Malays and his party" and that "if we truly fight for our race, one should not apologize".

See also
Appeal to motive
Boerehaat
Call-out culture
Identity politics
Laissez-faire racism
Race baiting
Wedge issue
Woman card

References

African-American-related controversies
American English idioms
Politics and race in the United States
Racism